Kenni Olsen (born 11 June 1985) is a Danish professional football midfielder, who currently plays for Danish 2nd Division East side Herlev IF. He is the twin brother of FC Midtjylland player Danny Olsen.

External links
FC Nordsjælland profile
Career statistics at Danmarks Radio

1985 births
Living people
Danish men's footballers
FC Nordsjælland players
Akademisk Boldklub players
Danish twins
Twin sportspeople
People from Hvidovre Municipality
Association football midfielders
Herlev IF players
Sportspeople from the Capital Region of Denmark